John Hambrick (born June 12, 1945) is an American politician who served as a Republican member of the Nevada Assembly. He represented Clark District 2 from November 5, 2008 to November 4, 2020.

Education
Hambrick attended multiple law enforcement institutes, including the Federal Law Enforcement Training Center.

Elections
2012 Hambrick was unopposed for both the June 12, 2012 Republican Primary and the November 6, 2012 General election, winning with 19,766 votes.
2008 When Republican Assemblyman R. Garn Mabey retired and left the District 2 seat open, Hambrick won the three-way August 12, 2008 Republican Primary with 1,295 votes (57.61%), and won the four-way November 4, 2008 General election with 11,781 votes (49.76%) against Democratic nominee Carlos Blumberg, Independent American candidate Jon Kamerath, and Libertarian candidate Edward Klapproth; Blumberg and Kamerath had challenged Mabey for the seat in 2006.
2010 Hambrick won the three-way June 8, 2010 Republican Primary with 2,866 votes (62.51%), and won the November 2, 2010 General election with 11,057 votes (57.73%) against Democratic nominee David Lerner and Independent American candidate Jon Kamerath.
 In 2020, Hambrick was unable run for re-election, as he was term limited.

References

External links
Official page at the Nevada Legislature
Campaign site
 

1945 births
Living people
People from the Las Vegas Valley
Politicians from Saint Paul, Minnesota
Speakers of the Nevada Assembly
Republican Party members of the Nevada Assembly
United States Secret Service agents
21st-century American politicians